Data management comprises all disciplines related to handling data as a valuable resource.

Concept

The concept of data management arose in the 1980s as technology moved from sequential processing  (first punched cards, then magnetic tape) to random access storage.  Since it was now possible to store a discrete fact and quickly access it using random access disk technology, those suggesting that data management was more important than business process management used arguments such as "a customer's home address is stored in 75 (or some other large number) places in our computer systems."  However, during this period, random access processing was not competitively fast, so those suggesting "process management" was more important than "data management" used batch processing time as their primary argument. As application software evolved into real-time, interactive usage, it became obvious that both management processes were important.  If the data was not well defined, the data would be mis-used in applications. If the process wasn't well defined, it was impossible to meet user needs.

Topics 
Topics in data management include:

 Data governance 
 Data asset
 Data governance
 Data trustee
 Data custodian or guardian
 Data steward
 Data subject
 Data ethics
 Data architecture
 Data architecture
 Dataflows
 Data modeling and design
 Database and storage management
 Data maintenance
 Database administration
 Database management system
 Business continuity planning
 Hierarchical storage management
 Data subsetting
 Data security
 Data access
 Data erasure
 Data privacy
 Data security
 Reference and master data 
 Data integration
 Master data management
 Reference data
 Data Integration and inter-operability
 Data movement (ETL, ELT)
 Data interoperability
 Documents and content 
 Document management system
 Records management
 Data warehousing and business intelligence and Analytics
 Business intelligence
 Data analysis and data mining
 Data warehouse and data mart
 Data analytics
 Metadata 
 Metadata management
 Metadata
 Metadata discovery
 Metadata publishing
 Metadata registry
 Data quality
 Data discovery
 Data cleansing
 Data integrity
 Data enrichment
 Data quality assurance
 Secondary data

Usage

In modern management usage, the term data is increasingly replaced by information or even knowledge in a non-technical context. Thus data management has become information management or knowledge management. This trend obscures the raw data processing and renders interpretation implicit. The distinction between data and derived value is illustrated by the information ladder.
However, data has staged a comeback with the popularisation of the term big data, which refers to the collection and analyses of massive sets of data.

Several organisations have established data management centers (DMC) for their operations.

See also

 Open data
 FAIR data
 Pseudonymization
 Information architecture
 Enterprise architecture
 Information design
 Information system
 Controlled vocabulary
 Data curation
 Data retention
 Data Management Association
 Data management plan
 Data mesh, a domain-oriented data architecture
 Computer data storage
 Data proliferation
 Digital preservation
 Document management
 Enterprise content management
 Hierarchical storage management
 Information repository
 Machine-readable documents
 Performance report
 System integration
 Customer data integration
 Identity management
 Identity theft
 Data theft
 ERP software
 CRM software

References

External links